Baked & Wired is a bakery and coffeehouse in the Georgetown neighborhood of Washington, D.C. It was opened in 2001 by Teresa Velazquez (co-owned with her husband Tony Velazquez) and specializes in baking cupcakes but also offers a wider range of other baked goods including cookies, quiches and brownies. Velazquez did not intend to open a cupcake shop, but the demand for the baked good eclipsed the other offerings.

Many locals consider Baked & Wired more of an "insider" choice, especially for those who live in Georgetown, whereas Georgetown Cupcake is more of a tourist phenomenon.

A Baked Joint
In 2015, the Valazquezs opened A Baked Joint in the Mount Vernon Triangle neighborhood, without their cupcakes but with coffee and "intriguing homemade breads", according to Lori McCue in The Washington Post.

References

External links

Bakeries of the United States
Restaurants established in 2001
2001 establishments in Washington, D.C.
Georgetown (Washington, D.C.)